Nectow v. City of Cambridge, 277 U.S. 183 (1928), was a United States Supreme Court case in which the Court reversed the Massachusetts Supreme Judicial Court ruling, and found that the invasion of the plaintiff's property right was "serious and highly injurious," and that the placement of the locus of the zoning ordinance would not promote the health, safety, convenience or general welfare of the inhabitants of Cambridge. It, along with Euclid v. Ambler, constituted the Supreme Court's case law on zoning until 1974.

References

External links
 
Case Brief is available from CaseBriefs.com

1928 in United States case law
United States Supreme Court cases
United States Supreme Court cases of the Taft Court
United States land use case law
Zoning in the United States
Takings Clause case law
History of Cambridge, Massachusetts